Thomas Lemuel "Lem" Johns (December 11, 1925 – May 10, 2014) was a member of the United States Secret Service present during the assassination of John F. Kennedy and the first inauguration of Lyndon B. Johnson.

Early life 
Johns was born in and grew up in Birmingham, Alabama and served as a member of the United States Naval Air Corps during World War II.

Education 
Johns attended the University of Alabama and later graduated from Howard College (now Samford University).

Career 
Johns joined the Alcohol and Tobacco Tax Division of the Internal Revenue Service (the forerunner of the Bureau of Alcohol, Tobacco, Firearms and Explosives) in 1952. He joined the United States Secret Service in 1954 and served until 1976, including many years as head of the Birmingham field office.

Death
Johns died in Hoover, Alabama on May 10, 2014.

References 

1925 births
2014 deaths
Military personnel from Birmingham, Alabama
People from Hoover, Alabama
Samford University alumni
University of Alabama alumni
United States Secret Service agents
United States Navy personnel of World War II
Internal Revenue Service people
Witnesses to the assassination of John F. Kennedy